Conservation Week (Kia Mahia Te Mahi) is an annual event in New Zealand to promote conservation of native plants and animals.

The 2020 dates were August 15-23 and the theme was "Nature Through New Eyes". The 2021 dates are September 4–12.

See also
Conservation in New Zealand

References

External links
Conservation Week page - Department of Conservation

Nature conservation in New Zealand
September observances
October observances